Reminder is one of seven Thames barges built between 1925 and 1930 for F W Horlock, Mistley.

History
In 1924 the Horlocks commissioned seven new steel Thames barges, of which Reminder was the fourth. Six of these ‘seven sisters’ are still afloat: Blue Mermaid was lost to a mine in World War 2.  They were built at Mistley.

References

Bibliography

External links

Reminder
1926 ships
Individual sailing vessels
Ships built in Mistley
Transport on the River Thames
Sailing ships of the United Kingdom
Ships and vessels of the National Historic Fleet